The Dugu sisters were part-Xianbei, part-Han sisters of the Dugu clan who lived in the Western Wei (535–557), Northern Zhou (557–581) and Sui (581–618) dynasties of China. All were daughters of the Western Wei general Dugu Xin. The eldest sister became a Northern Zhou Empress, the seventh sister became a Sui dynasty Empress, and the fourth sister was posthumously honored as an Empress of the Tang dynasty (618–907). The seventh sister Dugu Qieluo, in particular, was one of the most influential women in ancient China history, owing to her closeness to her husband, the Emperor Wen of Sui, throughout their 45-year monogamous marriage, and because of the power she gained from her closeness to her husband. Some authors wrote that the three sisters "married emperors" or "married into imperial families". However, at the time of their marriages, none of their husbands were members of an imperial family (yet): each of the three sisters became an Empress or a posthumous Empress after a dynastic change. Out of the three dynasty changes, only the first—the usurpation of the Western Wei throne by the Yuwens—is considered a long time coming, in which the Dugus played no role. In both Yang Jian's and Li Yuan's (Emperor Gaozu of Tang) rise to power, family ties to the ruling house (through the sisters and Dugu Qieluo's daughter Yang Lihua) were important.

Family tree

 – Dugu sisters
 – Western Wei (535–557) emperors
 – Northern Zhou (557–581) emperors
 – Western Liang (555–587) emperors
 – Sui dynasty (581–618) emperors
 – Tang dynasty (618–907) emperors

Basic information

No physical descriptions of them survived but their father was said to be very handsome. Dugu Xin was an ethnic (sinicized) Xianbei but both his wives Lady Guo and Lady Cui appear to be Han Chinese. The Dugus were all literate (in Classical Chinese), cultivated, and pious Buddhists.

In popular culture
The 2018 Chinese TV series The Legend of Dugu stars Hu Bingqing as Dugu Jialuo (i.e. Dugu Qieluo), Ady An as the eldest sister Dugu Banruo, and Li Yixiao as the middle sister Dugu Mantuo.

See also
Two Qiaos
Soong sisters

References

6th-century Chinese women
6th-century Chinese people
7th-century Chinese women
7th-century Chinese people
Sibling trios
Northern Zhou people